Charles Edgar Van Horn (November 23, 1901 – January 5, 1994) was an American football player. He played college football at Washington & Lee and professional football in the National Football League (NFL) as a back for the Buffalo Bisons in 1927 and for the Orange Tornadoes in 1929. He appeared in eight NFL games, four as a starter.

References

1901 births
1994 deaths
Washington and Lee Generals football players
Orange Tornadoes players
Players of American football from Washington, D.C.